Lars Øvernes (born 28 February 1989) is a retired Norwegian footballer who played as a goalkeeper. He has previously played for Haugesund in Eliteserien.

Hailing from Etne, Øvernes made his debut in Eliteserien against Vålerenga on 8 August 2010. After six seasons as the second-choice goalkeeper in Haugesund, where he played four matches in Eliteserien and ten league matches in total, Øvernes left Haugesund when his contract expired after the 2012 season and signed for HamKam.

He is a brother-in-law of Sindre Tjelmeland.

Career statistics

References 

1989 births
Living people
People from Etne
Norwegian footballers
Norway youth international footballers
FK Haugesund players
Hamarkameratene players
Sola FK players
Norwegian Second Division players
Norwegian First Division players
Eliteserien players
Association football goalkeepers
Sportspeople from Rogaland